Galbeni may refer to several villages in Romania:

 Galbeni, a village in Filipești Commune, Bacău County
 Galbeni, a village in Nicolae Bălcescu Commune, Bacău County
 Galbeni, a village in Havârna Commune, Botoșani County
 Galbeni, a village in Tănăsoaia Commune, Vrancea County